Tempos Modernos (English: Modern Times) is a Brazilian telenovela produced and broadcast by TV Globo. It premiered on 11 January 2010, replacing Caras & Bocas, and ended on 16 July 2010, replaced by Ti Ti Ti. The series is written by Bosco Brasil, with the collaboration of Izabel de Oliveira, Maria Elisa Berredo, Mário Teixeira and Patrícia Moretzsohn.

It stars Fernanda Vasconcellos, Thiago Rodrigues, Antônio Fagundes, and Eliane Giardini. Priscila Fantin, Danton Mello, Marcos Caruso, Regiane Alves, Vivianne Pasmanter, Otávio Muller, Felipe Camargo, and Malu Galli also star in main roles.

Cast 
 Fernanda Vasconcellos as Cornélia Cordeiro Santos Reis "Nelinha"
 Thiago Rodrigues as José Carlos Pimenta Cordeiro "Zeca"
 Antônio Fagundes as Leal Cordeiro
 Eliane Giardini as Hélia Pimenta
 Priscila Fantin as Nara Nolasco
 Marcos Caruso as Otto Niemann
 Vivianne Pasmanter as Regiane Cordeiro Mourão
 Regiane Alves as Goretti Cordeiro Bodanski "Gô"
 Otávio Muller as Altemir Assunção da Paz Bodanski (Bodanski)
 Felipe Camargo as Vinícius Porto de Mello "Portinho"
 Danton Mello as Renato Vieira de Mattos
 Alessandra Maestrini as Benedita Kusnezov Piñon "Dita'"
 Leonardo Medeiros as Ramon Piñon
 Guilherme Weber as Albano Mourão
 Grazi Massafera as Deodora Madureira Niemann / N. Anne
 Malu Galli as Iolanda Paranhos
 Guilherme Leicam as Led Piñon
 Aline Peixoto as Jannis Piñon
 Caroline Abras as Katrina
 João Baldasserini as Túlio Osório
 Débora Duarte as Tertuliana "Tertu"
 Otávio Augusto as Faustaço Lumbriga
 Selma Egrei as Tamara Palumbo
 Genézio de Barros as Pasquale
 Paula Possani as Maureen Lobianco
 Ricardo Blat as Fidélio
 Pascoal da Conceição as Zuppo
 Tuna Dwek as Justine
 Jairo Mattos as Gaulês "Jean Paul"
 Luciana Borghi as Bárbara Lee
 Cris Vianna as Tita Bicalho
 Edmilson Barros as Lindomar Mariano Assunção
 Cláudia Missura as Lavínia Palumbo
 Victor Pecoraro as Ricardo Maurício "Maurição"
 Naruna Costa as Dolores Damasceno
 Antônio Fragoso as Zapata
 Fabrício Boliveira as Nabuco Mota
 Eliana Pittman as Miranda Paranhos
 Márcio Seixas as Frankenstein "Frank" (voice)
 Joana Lerner as Heloísa "Helô"
 Darlan Cunha as João Carlos Paranhos "Joca"
 Janaína Ávila as Milena Morgado
 Anderson Lau as Okuda
 Alexandra Martins as Dulcinólia Lumbriga "Duba"
 Paulo Leal de Melo as Raulzão "Ducha Fria"
 Cássio Inácio as Tartana
 Gilberto Miranda as Madrugadinha
 Rafa Martins as Max do Cavaco
 Isabel Lobo as Thaís Trancoso
 Alexandre Cioletti as Valvênio
 Xandy Britto as Nelsinho Pallotti
 Polliana Aleixo as Maria Eunice Cordeiro Bodanski
 Ana Karolina Lannes as Maria Eugênia Cordeiro Bodanski
 Rebeca Orestein as Maria Helena Cordeiro Bodanski 
 Jenifer de Oliveira Andrade as Maria Clara Cordeiro Bodanski

References

External links 
 

2010 telenovelas
TV Globo telenovelas
Brazilian telenovelas
2010 Brazilian television series debuts
2010 Brazilian television series endings
2010s Brazilian television series
Portuguese-language telenovelas
Artificial intelligence in fiction